Angel Witch are a British heavy metal band from London. Formed in 1978 following the breakup of earlier outfit Lucifer, the group originally included vocalist and lead guitarist Kevin Heybourne, rhythm guitarist Rob Downing, bassist and keyboardist Kevin "Skids" Riddles, and drummer Dave "Day Vog" Hogg. The group's current lineup includes Heybourne, bassist Will Palmer (since 2009), rhythm guitarist Jimmy Martin (since 2015) and drummer Fredrik Jansson (since 2016).

History

1978–1990
After the breakup of Lucifer in 1978, Kevin Heybourne and Rob Downing formed Angel Witch with bassist Kevin "Skids" Riddles and drummer Dave "Day Vog" Hogg. The band released their first demos over the next year, before Downing left in December 1979 and the group became a trio. Shortly after the recording of their self-titled debut album, Hogg was forced to leave Angel Witch due to illness, with Dave Dufort taking his place. In the second half of 1981, both Dufort and Riddles left to form Tytan together. Heybourne subsequently disbanded Angel Witch and joined Deep Machine.

Heybourne reformed Angel Witch less than a year later, bringing vocalist Roger Marsden and drummer Ricky Bruce from Deep Machine, and adding bassist Jerry Cunningham. Marsden left shortly after due to stylistic differences, with Heybourne taking up lead vocals again. By 1983, Angel Witch had disbanded again as Heybourne had joined Lou Taylor's new group Blind Fury, where he remained for "about eight months" before leaving at the end of the year. He reformed Angel Witch in 1984 with returning drummer Dave Hogg, plus bassist Peter Gordelier and vocalist Dave Tattum.

Shortly after the release of 1985's Screamin' 'n' Bleedin', Hogg left again and was replaced by Spencer Hollman. Frontal Assault followed the next year, after which Tattum was dismissed and Heybourne returned to the role of lead vocalist. Adding rhythm guitarist Grant Dennison, the band recorded a live album in 1989, Angel Witch Live, which was issued the following year.

1990–2003
In 1990, Heybourne moved to the United States and formed a new incarnation of Angel Witch with bassist Jon Torres and drummer Tom Hunting. The trio recorded the three-track demo Twist of the Knife, which remained unreleased until the Resurrection compilation in 2000. Adding rhythm guitarist Doug Piercy, the band planned a tour of the United States later in the year. However, due to legal issues regarding his immigration to the US, Heybourne was deported back to the UK. The band subsequently dissolved, as Heybourne returned to his full-time job as a tree surgeon.

In 1997, Heybourne, Torres and Hunting reunited in the UK to record the Resurrection demo, which was included alongside 1990's Twist of the Knife and 1987's Psychopathic demos on the compilation of the same name. The group reformed officially in early 2000, with Heybourne joined by guitarist Keith Herzberg, bassist Richie Wicks and drummer Scott Higham. After issuing 2000: Live at the LA2 and recording the Halloween Session demo, Higham left in mid-2001. The group subsequently decided to disband, although by the following summer had reformed with the same lineup.

The reformation of Heybourne, Herzberg, Wicks and Higham was short-lived, however, as in January 2003 the frontman announced a new lineup featuring guitarist Lee Altus and returning rhythm section Jon Torres and Tom Hunting. Within two months, Hunting had bowed out and been replaced by Altus's Heathen bandmate Darren Minter for a short run of shows.

Since 2008
After another five-year break, Kevin Heybourne reformed Angel Witch in 2008, adding new guitarist Chris Fullard, bassist Will Palmer and drummer Andy Prestidge. In September 2010, Fullard was replaced by Carcass guitarist Bill Steer. 2012 saw the release of As Above, So Below, the group's first new studio material since 1998, and the following year saw Steer replaced by Tom Draper. By 2015, Draper had been replaced by Jimmy Martin, and the following year Fredrik Jansson had taken over on drums, following a brief stint by Alan French following Prestidge's departure.

In 2019, Angel Witch released their fifth full-length studio album, Angel of Light.

Members

Current

Former

Timeline

Lineups

References

Angel Witch